Bhanu may be:

 an epithet of the deity Surya
Eldest son of the Hindu deities-Shri Krishna and Devi Satyabhama
 the name of a place in Nepal:
Bhanu Municipality, the current municipality
Bhanu, Nepal, the former VDC

 a given name; notable people with the name include:
 Muktha (actress), stage name Bhanu
 Bhanu (Tamil militant)
 Bhanu Bandopadhyay, Indian actor
 Bhanubhakta Acharya, Nepali writer

See also 
 Banu (disambiguation)